Skills FC is a soccer club based in the U.S. Virgin Islands. The team competes in the St. Croix Soccer League.

Honors 
 St. Croix Soccer League:
 Runners-up (1): 2008–09

References 

Soccer clubs in the United States Virgin Islands